Santa Rosa de Tastil is a rural municipality in Salta Province in northwestern Argentina.

Overview

It is located in the Lerma Valley, near the ruins of the ancient indigenous city of Tastil, and is populated only by eleven persons, three of which are employees of the Moisés Serpa Regional Museum of Tastil. A clinic, police station, school and church serve the small population, as well as around 150 rural inhabitants of the surrounding area. The outpost was named for Santa Rosa de Lima in 1906. 

The Moisés Serpa Regional Museum of Tastil, inaugurated after the 1997 declaration of the ruins as a National Historic Monument the same year, and displays artifacts found at the site and surroundings, including a mummy dating from the 14th century. The Train to the Clouds, a heritage railway and the third-highest in the world, passes the location, and the Puerta de Tastil station is nearby.

References

External links
Redturs: Comunidad Santa Rosa de Tastil (Salta) 

Populated places in Salta Province
Populated places established in 1906
1906 establishments in Argentina